Mechanoluminescence is light emission resulting from any mechanical action on a solid.  It can be produced through ultrasound, or through other means.

 Fractoluminescence is caused by stress that results in the formation of fractures.
 Piezoluminescence is caused by pressure that results only in elastic deformation.
 Triboluminescence is nominally caused by rubbing, but actually because of resulting fractoluminescence, so is often used as a synonym.
 Sonoluminescence is the emission of short bursts of light from imploding bubbles in a liquid when excited by sound.
 Electrochemiluminescence is the emission induced by an electrochemical stimulus.

See also
List of light sources

References

External links 
 Ultrasound Generates Intense Mechanoluminescence

Luminescence
Light sources